Desi (Hindi देसी or देशी) is a Hindustani classical raga. This raga may be affiliated with the Asavari thaat or with the Kafi thaat depending on the way of presentation. It is similar to raga Barwa.

References
V. N. Bhatkhande, Music Systems in India (A comparative study of some of the leading music systems of the 15th, 16th, 17th and 18th centuries), 1st ed., 1984, S. Lal & Co., New Delhi, India.

External links
 SRA on Raga Desi
 SRA on Samay and Ragas
 SRA on Ragas and Thaats
 Rajan Parrikar on Ragas

Desi